The London Museum may refer to:
 London Museum (1912–1976), a museum in London merged with another in 1976 to form the Museum of London
 London Museum, the new name for the Museum of London following its reopening at its new Smithfield site in 2026